Alex Trivellato (born 5 January 1993 in Bolzano) is an Italian professional ice hockey defenceman. He is currently playing for Schwenninger Wild Wings of the Deutsche Eishockey Liga (DEL).

Playing career
Trivellato spent the 2015–16 season, with the Schwenninger Wild Wings on loan from Eisbären Berlin of the DEL. In producing 9 points in 50 games with Schwenninger, he was signed to a one-year permanent deal to remain with the Wild Wings on February 18, 2016.

During his fourth year with the Krefeld Pinguine in the pandemic delayed 2020–21 season, Trivellato made 15 appearances, posting 4 points, before leaving the club and signing for the remainder of the season with Swedish second tier outfit, Västerås IK of the Allsvenskan, on 14 February 2021.

On 2 May 2022, Trivellato returned to former German club, Schwenninger Wild Wings of the DEL, agreeing to a one-year contract for the 2022–23 season.

References

External links
 

1993 births
Living people
Bolzano HC players
Dresdner Eislöwen players
Eisbären Berlin players
Italian ice hockey defencemen
Krefeld Pinguine players
Rote Teufel Bad Nauheim players
Ice hockey people from Bolzano
Schwenninger Wild Wings players
VIK Västerås HK players